"Animales" (English: "Animals") is a song by American singer Romeo Santos featuring rapper Nicki Minaj from Santos's second studio album Formula, Vol. 2.

Chart performance

References

Songs about animals
2014 songs
Romeo Santos songs
Nicki Minaj songs
Songs written by Romeo Santos
Spanish-language songs
Songs written by Nicki Minaj
Male–female vocal duets